Free Democratic Party is the name of several political parties around the world. It usually designates a party ideologically based on liberalism.

Current parties with that name include:
Free Democratic Party (Germany), a liberal political party in Germany
Free Democratic Party (Liberia)
FDP.The Liberals, a conservative liberal political party in Switzerland
Free Democrats (Armenia)

Historical parties of the name include:
Free Democratic Party (GDR)
Free Democratic Party (Northern Cyprus)
Free Democratic Party of Switzerland
Free Democratic Party (Turkey)

See also
Free Democrats (disambiguation)
Liberal Democratic Party (disambiguation)
Liberal Party